This is a list of members of the South Australian House of Assembly from 1884 to 1887, as elected at the 1884 colonial election:

 Albert MHA Rudolph Henning died on 24 November 1884. Andrew Dods Handyside won the resulting by-election on 5 January 1885.
 Wallaroo MHA Henry Allerdale Grainger resigned on 19 January 1885. David Bews won the resulting by-election on 16 February.
 Stanley MHA John Miller resigned on 20 April 1885. John Darling, senior won the resulting by-election on 15 May.
 Sturt MHA Thomas King resigned on 6 July 1885. Samuel Dening Glyde won the resulting by-election on 17 July.
 Albert MHA Arthur Hardy resigned on 8 February 1886. He recontested his seat and was elected unopposed on 9 March.
 East Adelaide MHA George Dutton Green resigned on 15 May 1886. Theodor Scherk won the resulting by-election on 31 May.

References

Members of South Australian parliaments by term
19th-century Australian politicians